The NAIA Women's Golf Championship is the annual tournament since 1995 to determine the national champions of women's NAIA collegiate golf in the United States and Canada. It has been a 72-hole tournament since 2001.

The most successful program is Oklahoma City, with eight NAIA national titles.

British Columbia are the reigning national champions, winning their sixth national title in 2022.

Results

Note: †Keiser University was formerly Northwood University–Florida * Won in a playoff

Team titles
The following schools have won an NAIA team championship:

Multiple winners

Individual champion
No golfers have won more than one NAIA Championship.

Individual champion's school
The following schools have produced more than one individual champion:
4 champions: Oklahoma City
2 champions: Lynn
2 champions: SCAD Savannah

See also
AIAW Intercollegiate Women's Golf Champions
NAIA Men's Golf Championship
NCAA Women's Golf Championships (Division I, Division II, Division III)

References

College golf in the United States
Golf
Women's golf tournaments in the United States